Jan Lipski (Count Jan VIII Lipski) of Łada coat of arms (1589–1641) was a bishop of Chełmno (1636–1639), crown referendary and Archbishop of Gniezno and Primate of Poland (from 1639).

Early life 
In 1589, Lipski was born in a noble family (szlachta).

Career 
Lipski chose an ecclesiastical career. He held several important posts at the court of Polish king Zygmunt III Waza and his wife Constance of Austria, later at the court of Władysław IV Waza.

In 1636, Lipski was ordained as bishop of Chełmno in Poland.
In 1638, Lipski became an archbishop of Gniezno in Poland.

In 1637, Lipski was sent by king Władysław to Vienna to escort his future wife, Cecylia Renata. At that time Emperor Ferdinand of the Holy Roman Empire gave him the title of count.

Personal life 
On May 13, 1641, Lipski died in his palace in Łyszkowice; it was rumored that he was poisoned by the Protestants.

References

External links
 Virtual tour Gniezno Cathedral  
List of Primates of Poland 

Ecclesiastical senators of the Polish–Lithuanian Commonwealth
Polish Counts of the Holy Roman Empire
Canons of Wrocław
Canons of Kraków
1589 births
1641 deaths
Counts of Poland
Archbishops of Gniezno
17th-century Roman Catholic archbishops in the Polish–Lithuanian Commonwealth